National Postcode Lottery may refer to:

 Nationale Postcode Loterij
 People's Postcode Lottery
 UK Postcode Lottery